Afrasia Bank Zimbabwe Limited, also referred to as Afrasia Bank Zimbabwe, is a  commercial bank in Zimbabwe. It is one of the regulated banking institutions licensed by the Reserve Bank of Zimbabwe, the country's central bank and national banking regulator.

History
The bank was established in 1997, as Kingdom Bank Zimbabwe Limited, by Lysias C Sibanda, Frank Kufa, Nigel Chanakira and Solomon Mugavazi . In January 2012, AfrAsia Bank Limited, a financial services provider, based in Mauritius, invested US$9.5 million in the bank's holding company, thereby acquiring 35% ownership in the Zimbabwean financial group. Until September 2013, the bank was a subsidiary of Kingdom Financial Holdings Limited (KFHL), a publicly traded company on the Zimbabwe Stock Exchange. In 2013, due to changes in ownership, KFHL rebranded to AfrAsia Zimbabwe Holdings Limited (AZHL), while the bank took up its present name. The 35.7% shareholding that the holding company previously held in Kingdom Africa Bank Limited, an investment bank in Botswana, was disposed of in September 2013.

Subsidiaries
The AfrAsia Bank Zimbabwe Group includes the following bank subsidiaries:
 AfrAsia Capital Management (Private) Limited 
 MicroKing Finance Limited - A microfinance company

Shareholding
, shareholding in the stock of the bank, is as depicted in the table below:

See also
 List of banks in Zimbabwe
 Reserve Bank of Zimbabwe
 Economy of Zimbabwe
 FDH Bank
 AfrAsia Bank Limited

References

External links
  Website of Reserve Bank of Zimbabwe
 KFHL In Process of Re-listing on Zimbabwe Stock Exchange
 Nigel Chanakira Exits AfrAsia Bank Limited
  Kingdom Financial Holdings Limited Sold Its Ownership In FDH Financial Holdings Limited of Malawi In 2012

Banks of Zimbabwe
Banks established in 1997
1997 establishments in Zimbabwe
Companies based in Harare